A piccolo is a small flute.

Piccolo may also refer to:

Musical instruments
 Piccolo trumpet
 Piccolo clarinet
 Piccolo oboe
 Piccolo saxophone, better known as the soprillo
 Violino piccolo
 Violoncello piccolo
 Piccolo heckelphone
 Piccolo snare drum
 Piccolo bass

Theatres
 Piccolo Teatro (Milan), Italy's first permanent theatre

People
 Piccolo (surname), a list of people

Fictional characters
 Piccolo (Dragon Ball), from the Dragon Ball series
 King Piccolo, a demon king from the Dragon Ball series
 Anthony Piccolo, on the television series seaQuest DSV
 Piccolo, a Pixl from Super Paper Mario

Other uses
 Il Piccolo, the daily newspaper of the region of Trieste, Italy
 Piccolo (film), a 1959 Yugoslavian film
 Piccolo (album), a 1977 release by the Ron Carter Quartet
 Piccolo Summit, a mountain in British Columbia, Canada
 1366 Piccolo, an asteroid
 Piccolo (firecracker), a firecracker sold in Europe
 Technoflug Piccolo, a German motor glider
 A specific implementation of zooming user interface
 A quarter-size bottle of champagne 
 A form of data transmission by shortwave radio using multiple frequency-shift keying
 Piccolo protein (presynaptic cytomatrix protein), PCLO
 A medium-sized variety of cherry tomato
 Piccolo (horse)
 Piccolo, an upmarket brand of baby food